The 58th Writers Guild of America Awards, given on February 4, 2006, honored the best film and television writers of 2005.

Winners and nominees

Film

Adapted Screenplay
 Brokeback Mountain – Larry McMurtry and Diana Ossana
Capote – Dan Futterman
The Constant Gardener – Jeffrey Caine
A History of Violence – Josh Olson
Syriana – Stephen Gaghan

Original Screenplay
 Crash – Paul Haggis and Bobby Moresco
The 40-Year-Old Virgin – Judd Apatow and Steve Carell
Cinderella Man – Akiva Goldsman and Cliff Hollingsworth
Good Night, and Good Luck. – George Clooney and Grant Heslov
The Squid and the Whale – Noah Baumbach

Documentary Screenplay
 Enron: The Smartest Guys in the Room –  Alex Gibney; based on the book The Smartest Guys in the Room: The Amazing Rise and Scandalous Fall of Enron by Bethany McLean and Peter Elkind
Cowboy del Amor – Michèle Ohayon
The Fall of Fujimori – Ellen Perry, Zack Anderson, and Kim Roberts
March of the Penguins – Luc Jacquet and Michel Fessler (narration written by Jordan Roberts); based on the story by Luc Jacquet
Street Fight – Marshall Curry

Television

Dramatic Series
 Lost  – J. J. Abrams, Kim Clements, Carlton Cuse, Leonard Dick, Paul Dini, Brent Fletcher, David Fury, Drew Goddard, Javier Grillo-Marxuach, Adam Horowitz, Jennifer Johnson, Christina M. Kim, Edward Kitsis, Jeffrey Lieber, Damon Lindelof, Lynne E. Litt, Monica Macer, Steven Maeda, Elizabeth Sarnoff, Janet Tamaro, Christian Taylor, Craig Wright
Deadwood – Regina Corrado, Sara Hess, Ted Mann, Bryan McDonald, Bernadette McNamara, David Milch, Peter Ocko, Elizabeth Sarnoff, Steve Shill, Nick Towne, Jody Worth
Grey's Anatomy – Zoanne Clack, Ann Hamilton, Kip Koenig, Stacy McKee, James D. Parriott, Tony Phelan, Joan Rater, Shonda Rhimes, Mimi Schmir, Gabrielle Stanton, Krista Vernoff, Harry Werksman
Six Feet Under – Alan Ball, Scott Buck, Rick Cleveland, Bruce Eric Kaplan, Nancy Oliver, Kate Robin, Jill Soloway, Craig Wright
The West Wing – Eli Attie, Debora Cahn, Carol Flint, Mark Goffman, Alex Graves, Peter Noah, Lawrence O'Donnell, Lauren Schmidt, Josh Singer, Aaron Sorkin, John Wells, Bradley Whitford, John Sacret Young

Comedy Series
 Curb Your Enthusiasm  – Larry David
Arrested Development – Barbara Feldman, Brad Copeland, Richard Day, Karey Dornetto, Jake Farrow, Abraham Higginbotham, Mitchell Hurwitz, Sam Laybourne, John Levenstein, Courtney Lilly, Dean Lorey, Chuck Martin, Lisa Parsons, Richard Rosenstock, Tom Saunders, Maria Semple, Chuck Tatham, Jim Vallely, Ron Weiner
Entourage – Brian Burns, Larry Charles, Cliff Dorfman, Doug Ellin, Chris Henchy, Stephen Levinson, Rob Weiss
My Name Is Earl – Barbara Feldman, Bobby Bowman, Vali Chandrasekaran, J.B. Cook, Brad Copeland, Victor Fresco, Gregory Thomas Garcia, John Hoberg, Kat Likkel, Michael Pennie, Timothy Stack, Hilary Winston, Danielle Sanchez
The Office – Jennifer Celotta, Greg Daniels, Lee Eisenberg, Ricky Gervais, Mindy Kaling, Paul Lieberstein, Stephen Merchant, B. J. Novak, Michael Schur, Gene Stupnitsky, Larry Wilmore

New Series
 Grey's Anatomy  – Zoanne Clack, Ann Lewis Hamilton, Kip Koenig, Stacy McKee, James D. Parriott, Tony Phelan, Joan Rater, Shonda Rhimes, Mimi Schmir, Gabrielle G. Stanton, Krista Vernoff, Harry Werksman and Mark Wilding
Everybody Hates Chris – Aron Abrams, Rodney Barnes, Craig DiGregorio, Alyson Fouse, Howard Gewirtz, Ali LeRoi, Courtney Lilly, Chris Rock, Gregory Thompson and Kriss Turner
My Name Is Earl – Barbara Feldman, Bobby Bowman, Vali Chandrasekaran, J.B. Cook, Brad Copeland, Victor Fresco, Gregory Thomas Garcia, John Hoberg, Kat Likkel, Michael Pennie, Timothy Stack, Hilary Winston and Danielle Sanchez
The Office – Jennifer Celotta, Greg Daniels, Lee Eisenberg, Ricky Gervais, Mindy Kaling, Paul Lieberstein, Stephen Merchant, B. J. Novak, Michael Schur, Gene Stupnitsky and Larry Wilmore
Rome – Alexandra Cunningham, David Frankel, Bruno Heller, Adrian Hodges, William J. MacDonald and John Milius

Episodic Drama
 "Autopsy" – House – Lawrence Kaplow
"Grave Danger" – CSI: Crime Scene Investigation – Anthony E. Zuiker, Carol Mendelsohn, Naren Shankar (teleplay); Quentin Tarantino (story)
"Rhea Reynolds" – Nip/Tuck – Jennifer Salt
"Singing for Our Lives" – Six Feet Under – Scott Buck
"Normal Is the Watchword" – Veronica Mars – Rob Thomas
"A Good Day" – The West Wing – Carol Flint

Episodic Comedy
 "You Can't Miss the Bear (Pilot)" – Weeds – Jenji Kohan
"Diversity Day" – The Office – B. J. Novak
"Exile on Main Street (Pilot)" – Kitchen Confidential – David Hemingson
"Motivational Seminar" – Malcolm in the Middle – Rob Ulin
"Next" – Desperate Housewives – Jenna Bans & Kevin Murphy
"Pilot" – My Name Is Earl – Greg Garcia

Long Form – Adapted
 The Life and Death of Peter Sellers  – Christopher Markus and Stephen McFeely
The Colt – Stephen Harrigan
Lackawanna Blues – Ruben Santiago-Hudson
Our Fathers – Thomas Michael Donnelly

Long Form – Original
 Warm Springs  – Margaret Nagle
Dirt – Richard Guay and Nancy Savoca
The Librarian: Quest for the Spear – David N. Titcher
The Reading Room – Randy Feldman

Daytime Serials
 The Young and the Restless  – Kay Alden, John F. Smith, Trent Jones, Jim Houghton, Sandra Weintraub, Chris Abbott, Joshua S. McCaffrey, Sara A. Bibel, Janice Ferri Esser, Natalie Minardi Slater, Eric Freiwald, Sally Sussman Morina

References
WGA - Previous award winners

2005
2005 film awards
2005 guild awards
2005 television awards
2005 awards in the United States
2005 in American cinema
2005 in American television
February 2006 events in the United States